Off Limits is a 1953 comedy film directed by  George Marshall and starring Bob Hope, Mickey Rooney and Marilyn Maxwell. Hope plays a manager who enlists in the army to keep an eye on his boxer, who has been drafted. The picture was written by  Hal Kanter and Jack Sher, and was released in the UK as Military Policemen, as the characters played by Hope and Rooney join the military police.

Plot
Wally Hogan (Hope) has things going his way. He is the manager-trainer of Bullet Bradley (Stanley Clements), a fighter who has just won the lightweight championship. Life suddenly takes a not-so-happy turn, however, when Bullet gets drafted. Hogan's gangster partners persuade him to enlist and keep an eye on the fighter, who is subsequently declared psychologically unfit for the Army. Enter Herbert Tuttle (Mickey Rooney), a draftee eager to have Hogan turn him into a fighter. Hogan reluctantly agrees only after he discovers Tuttle's aunt is the beautiful singer (Marilyn Maxwell) at a nightclub. From then on it is a case of stringing Tuttle along while trying to get close to his aunt. To further complicate Hogan's life there is a military policeman who tries to squash the shenanigans.

Cast
Bob Hope as Wally Hogan
Mickey Rooney as Herbert Tuttle
Marilyn Maxwell as Connie Curtis
Eddie Mayehoff as Karl Danzig
Stanley Clements as Bullets Bradley
Jack Dempsey as himself
Marvin Miller as Vic Breck
John Ridgely as Lieutenant Commander Parnell
Tom Harmon as himself
Norman Leavitt as Chowhound
Art Aragon as himself
Kim Spalding as Seaman Harker
Jerry Hausner as Fishy
Mike Mahoney as MP Huggins
Joan Taylor as Helen
Carolyn Jones as Deborah (uncredited)
Charles Bronson as Russell (uncredited)

Production
 During the final bar scene, Bing Crosby, Bob Hope's frequent co-star, is seen briefly, singing on the bar's television set. 
 Alan Young was to co-star with Hope in the picture. 
 In addition to retired champion boxer Jack Dempsey, the film features Art Aragon, a popular Southern California boxer. 
 Orchestra leader and vocalist Nuzzy Marcellino dubbed "wolf-whistles" for the picture, according to Paramount press information, included in the file on the film at the AMPAS Library.
 Publicity also notes that the Provost Marshal General's office in Washington, D.C. gave Mickey Rooney special permission to depict an MP, even though the minimum height requirement was 5'7" and Rooney was only 5'3". 
 Hope and Marilyn Maxwell had an affair spanning years that led insiders to refer to her as "Mrs. Bob Hope."
 Rooney wore his World War II uniform in the film, according to publicity.

References

External links

1953 films
1950s sports comedy films
American boxing films
American comedy films
American black-and-white films
Films directed by George Marshall
Military humor in film
Paramount Pictures films
Films with screenplays by Jack Sher
1953 comedy films
1950s English-language films
1950s American films